The Saddle King is a 1929 American silent Western film directed by Ben F. Wilson and starring Cliff Lyons, Neva Gerber and Al Ferguson.

Cast
 Cliff Lyons as Rance Baine
 Neva Gerber as Felice Landreau
 Al Ferguson as Mort Landreau
 Glen Cook as Dr. Harvey Baine
 Jack Casey as Sam Winters
 Cheyenne Bill
 Irving Wafford
 Victor Allen

References

Bibliography
 Connelly, Robert B. The Silents: Silent Feature Films, 1910-36, Volume 40, Issue 2. December Press, 1998.
 Munden, Kenneth White. The American Film Institute Catalog of Motion Pictures Produced in the United States, Part 1. University of California Press, 1997.

External links
 

1929 films
1929 Western (genre) films
1920s English-language films
American silent feature films
Silent American Western (genre) films
American black-and-white films
Films directed by Ben F. Wilson
1920s American films